Aduana is one of the seven major Akan clans of Ghana. It is also the largest clan in terms of population.

The totem of the Aduana clan is a dog. According to legend, a dog led the clan during their migration process, lighting the path with fire in its mouth. It is also believed that this fire is still at the palace of the clan's major town.

References

Ghanaian culture
Akan culture